Kwandakwensizwa Ishmael Mngonyama (born 25 September 1993) is a South African professional soccer player who plays as a defender for Moroka Swallows.

He has the ability to play across the back four although most often plays as a centre-back at club level and right-back at international level.

Honours 
Bidvest Wits F.C.
Runners-up
 Nedbank Cup: 2013–14

Champions
 MTN 8: 2018
Cape Town City

References

External links

Kwanda Mngonyama at News24

1993 births
Living people
South African soccer players
Association football defenders
Bidvest Wits F.C. players
Maritzburg United F.C. players
Cape Town City F.C. (2016) players
Orlando Pirates F.C. players
Moroka Swallows F.C. players
South African Premier Division players
2015 Africa U-23 Cup of Nations players
South Africa international soccer players
Footballers at the 2016 Summer Olympics
Olympic soccer players of South Africa
South Africa A' international soccer players
2014 African Nations Championship players